was a Japanese samurai of the mid-Sengoku period. Longtime retainer of Matsudaira Hirotada and later, his son Tokugawa Ieyasu. When Ieyasu was sent to Sunpu Castle to be a hostage to the Imagawa clan, Tadayoshi served alongside Matsudaira Shigeyoshi as castle warden of Okazaki Castle. He was renowned as a model of frugality, eventually saving up enough money by the time Ieyasu returned, in order to rearm the Matsudaira (Tokugawa) clan. 

Tadayoshi was a father in law of Honda Shigetsugu. 
In later years, he was held up as the model Mikawa-era Tokugawa vassal. After he died, his son, Torii Mototada succeeded the Torii family headship.

References
Information on various Sengoku figures, including Tadayoshi

Samurai
1571 deaths
Torii clan
Year of birth unknown